Byker Hill is the third solo album by English folk musician Martin Carthy, originally released in 1967 by Fontana Records and later re-issued by Topic Records. The album features Dave Swarbrick  playing fiddle on a number of the tracks.

Track listing
The references after the titles below are from the three major numbering schemes for traditional folk songs, the Roud Folk Song Index, Child Ballad Numbers and the Laws Numbers.
All songs Traditional, arranged by Martin Carthy; except where indicated

Personnel
 Martin Carthy - guitar, vocals
 Dave Swarbrick - fiddle
Technical
Tony Engle - sleeve design
David Redfern - sleeve photography

Album information
First released in the UK 1967 by Fontana Records STL5434, 886 441 TY
Re-issued 1977 by Topic Records 12TS342
CD issued 1993 by Topic Records TSCD342

References

External links
Byker Hill at discogs.com

Martin Carthy albums
Dave Swarbrick albums
1967 albums
Fontana Records albums
Topic Records albums
Folk albums by English artists